Emily Abigail Ashley Hoes Gauna (born 20 May 1994) is a Dutch film and television actress. She won a Golden Calf for Best Actress at the Netherlands Film Festival and a Shooting Stars Award at the Berlin International Film Festival for her role in Nena (2014).

Filmography

Film
 Maite was here (2009) – role: Maite
 Tirza (2010) – role: Ibi
 Finnemans (2010) –role: Lizzie
 Nina Satana 2011) – role: Nina
 Furious (film) (2011) – role: Roosmarijn
 To Be King (2012) – role: Kim
 Nena (2014) – role: Nena
 Escape (2015) – role: young Julia
 Ventoux (2015) – role: young Laura
 ‘’Hotel de Grote L’’ (2017) - role: Libbie
 Zwaar verliefd! (2018) - role: Tamara
 Cuban Love (2019) – role: Maartje
 Costa!! (2022)

Television
 SpangaS (2008) – role: Brechtje
 The Year Zero (2009–2012) – role: Felix
 VRijland (2010–2012) – role: Daantje Kruithof
 Feuten (2012) – role: Charlie Zekveld
 Violetta (2013) – voice: Violetta
 Snow White (2014) – role: Blanche (Snow White)

As contestant
 De Verraders (2021)

Awards 
 Golden Calf for Best Actress (2014) for her role Nena in Nena
 Shooting Stars Award (2015) for her role Nena in Nena

References

External links

 
 

1994 births
Living people
21st-century Dutch actresses
Dutch film actresses
Dutch television actresses
Dutch voice actresses
Actors from Rotterdam
Golden Calf winners